Visperad or Visprad is either a particular Zoroastrian religious ceremony or the name given to a passage collection within the greater Avesta compendium of texts.

Overview
The Visperad ceremony "consists of the rituals of the Yasna, virtually unchanged, but with a liturgy extended by twenty-three supplementary sections." These supplementary sections (kardag) are then – from a philological perspective – the passages that make up the Visperad collection. The standard abbreviation for Visperad chapter-verse pointers is Vr., though Vsp. may also appear in older sources.

The name Visperad is a contraction of Avestan vispe ratavo, with an ambiguous meaning. Subject to how ratu is translated, vispe ratavo  may be translated as "(prayer to) all patrons" or "all masters" or the older and today less common "all chiefs." or "all lords."

The Visperad ceremony – in medieval Zoroastrian texts referred to as the Jesht-i Visperad, that is, "Worship through praise (Yasht) of all the patrons," –  developed as an "extended service" for celebrating the gahambars, the high Zoroastrian festivals that celebrate six season(al) events. As seasonal ("year cycle") festivals, the gahambars are dedicated to the Amesha Spentas, the divinites that are in tradition identified with specific aspects of creation, and through whom Ahura Mazda realized ("with his thought") creation. These "bounteous immortals" (amesha spentas) are the "all patrons" – the vispe ratavo – who apportion the bounty of creation. However, the Visperad ceremony itself is dedicated to Ahura Mazda, the ratūm berezem "high Master."

The Visperad collection has no unity of its own, and is never recited separately from the Yasna. During a recital of the Visperad ceremony, the Visperad sections are not recited en bloc but are instead interleaved into the Yasna recital. The Visperad itself exalts several texts of the Yasna collection, including the Ahuna Vairya and the Airyaman ishya, the Gathas, and the Yasna Haptanghaiti (Visperad 13–16, 18–21, 23-24) Unlike in a regular Yasna recital, the Yasna Haptanghaiti is recited a second time between the 4th and 5th Gatha (the first time between the 1st and 2nd as in a standard Yasna). This second recitation is performed by the assistant priest (the raspi), and is often slower and more melodious. In contrast to barsom bundle of a regular Yasna, which has 21 rods (tae), the one used in a Visperad service has 35 rods.

The Visperad is only performed in the Havan Gah – between sunrise and noon – on the six gahambar days.

Amongst Iranian Zoroastrians, the Visperad ceremony has undergone significant modifications in the 20th century. The ritual – which is traditionally an "inner" one requiring ritual purity – is instead celebrated as an "outer" ritual where ritual purity is not a requirement. Often there is only one priest instead of the two that are traditionally required, and the priests sit at a table with only a lamp or candle representing the fire, so avoiding accusations of "fire worship."

Notes


References

Bibliography

  (fasc., 1979, Berlin: de Gruyter)

External links

 Geldner's transliteration and Mills' translation of the  Visperad at avesta.org

Avesta